The Tadpole is a small dinghy with an approximate length of  and an approximate beam of 3 feet. Its gaff rig has  of sail area.

References

External links
https://web.archive.org/web/20070917000249/http://www.ivers.demon.co.uk/merryman.htm

Dinghies